Ravanna may refer to:

 Ravanna, Missouri
 Ravanna, Kansas
 Ravanna (film), a 2000 Tollywood action film 
 Ravana is a ten-headed demon king in the Ramayana